Jennizel Cabalan  (born 6 September 1994) is a Filipino women's international footballer who plays as a midfielder. She is a member of the Philippines women's national football team. She was part of the team at the 2015 AFF Women's Championship. On the collegiate level she played for University of Santo Tomas and scored 3 goals at the UAAP Season 78 football tournaments in 2016. She was also part of the UST team that participated at the 2015 PFF Women's Cup scoring three goals.

Cabalan joined OutKast F.C. which participated in the inaugural season of the PFF Women's League.

References

1994 births
Living people
Filipino women's footballers
Philippines women's international footballers
Place of birth missing (living people)
Women's association football midfielders
University of Santo Tomas alumni
University Athletic Association of the Philippines footballers